Henrique Filellini (born 18 July 1939) is a Brazilian water polo player. He competed in the men's tournament at the 1968 Summer Olympics.

References

1939 births
Living people
Brazilian male water polo players
Olympic water polo players of Brazil
Water polo players at the 1968 Summer Olympics
Water polo players from São Paulo